Vrbovec is a town in Zagreb County, Croatia, lying to the northeast of the capital Zagreb.

Geography

Population
In the 2011 Croatian census, the total population of the administrative territory of Vrbovec was 14,797, in the following settlements:

 Banovo, population 113
 Brčevec, population 546
 Celine, population 977
 Cerik, population 48
 Cerje, population 217
 Dijaneš, population 167
 Đivan, population 32
 Donji Tkalec, population 97
 Dulepska, population 155
 Gaj, population 381
 Gornji Tkalec, population 185
 Gostović, population 139
 Graberanec, population 0
 Graberšćak, population 87
 Greda, population 96
 Hruškovica, population 71
 Konak, population 115
 Krkač, population 89
 Kućari, population 92
 Lonjica, population 1,020
 Lovrečka Varoš, population 157
 Lovrečka Velika, population 198
 Luka, population 840
 Lukovo, population 184
 Marenić, population 58
 Martinska Ves, population 506
 Naselje Stjepana Radića, population 246
 Negovec, population 176
 Novo Selo, population 123
 Peskovec, population 323
 Pirakovec, population 170
 Podolec, population 96
 Poljana, population 423
 Poljanski Lug, population 425
 Prilesje, population 181
 Samoborec, population 117
 Savska Cesta, population 162
 Topolovec, population 133
 Vrbovec, population 4,947
 Vrbovečki Pavlovec, population 398
 Vrhovec, population 140
 Žunci, population 167

In 2011, 97.66% of the population were Croats.

Administration
Town government, court, police, health and postal services are the part of infrastructure of Vrbovec. From 2001 to 2005 the mayor was Zlatko Herček (HSS). He was succeeded by Vladimir Bregović (HDZ) in 2005. After 12 years in office Mayor Bregović was succeeded in 2017 by Denis Kralj (SDP). Kralj won the highest number of votes in the second round elections since the introduction of direct elections for mayor in Vrbovec.

History

Vrbovec was first mentioned in written documents dated April 21, 1244. The document today lies in the Archbishop's archive in Zagreb, in serial Privilegialia. It was published by Croatian-Hungarian King Bela III (IV), where feudal field was given to the countman Junk, the son of Izak from Ravno (village), whose right are confirmed from the Koloman (brother of King Bela). The countman Junk was the higher officer at Križevci's county.

A mid-air airplane collision occurred near Vrbovec on September 10, 1976.

Economy
The main industries in Vrbovec are the production of meat and meat products. The most importact local employer is Meat Industry PIK Vrbovec, 
which employs 1,600 people. As a part of the conglomeration ForteNova group, it has become a very important producer of meat in Croatia.
Other companies are PosPlast, Bravel, Oprema-group, smaller companies which are growing at the old industrial zone, as followers of ex-companies such were it: Šavrić/Pevex, Gradip (brick makers), and Oprema. 
There is the society of small Private entrepreneurs of Vrbovec, too. Their production are mostly for parts for different European's industries. 
A large co-operation around Vrbovec at the agriculture fields are continuing to exist in the modern times, despite the depopulation of the local villages and less interest of young people for the work in fields.

Sights
Notable buildings in Vrbovec include the Mausoleum of family De Piennes in the local cemetery. the Tower of Petar Zrinski in Vrbovec, the castle of Patačić in Vrbovec, the castle of Lovrečina Grad, and the church of Saint Vitus in Vrbovec.

Education
The first elementary school was founded in 1669. Today Vrbovec has two elementary schools named 1st. and 2nd. Vrbovec school, and one high-school, which includes large choice of education from classical gymnasium to the industrial orientation.

In Vrbovec is active Pučko Otvoreno Učilište (public open college), where additional education is possible to be obtained. Different courses helps to the local community in change of own wishes for the knowledge.

The university doesn't exist in Vrbovec, mostly students are going naturally to Zagreb. Reach by train or bus, its half-to-one-hour travel to the University in Zagreb.

Culture
Vrbovec has got a local small cinema, culture-art society HKUD "Petar Zrinski", a library, a radio station Vrbovec, and the people's university of Vrbovec. There is no local TV station, theatre (opera) or university. People travel to Zagreb as the centre of these activities.

"Kaj su jeli naši stari" is the main traditional annual event in Vrbovec. Usually, last week-end of August, this manifestation is a chance to see whole town at one place.

Another important date is June 15, the town day, and the celebration of Saint Vitus, the protector of Vrbovec.

Vrbovečka udruga mladih is an organisation very popular among the younger people of Vrbovec.

Sport
The local football club is NK Vrbovec, of the Croatian Third League. There is also the KK Petar Zrinski basketball club and the HK Vrbovec wrestling club.

Notable people
Petar Zrinski, Ban of Croatia and writer
Marija Jurić Zagorka, first female journalist in Croatia and writer, born in Negovec
Josip Pankretić, parliamentarian
Leona Paraminski, actress

Twin towns – sister cities

Vrbovec is twinned with:
 Kispest (Budapest), Hungary
 Périers, France

References

External links

 

Cities and towns in Croatia
Populated places in Zagreb County